James Stephenson (1889–1941) was a British actor.

James Stephenson may also refer to:

James Stephenson (congressman) (1764–1833), U.S. Representative from Virginia
James W. Stephenson (1806–1838), American militia officer and politician
James Stephenson (engraver) (1808–1886), English engraver
Jim Stephenson, New Zealand footballer
James Stephenson (rugby union) (born 1990), English rugby union player
James McNeil Stephenson, American lawyer, businessman and politician in Virginia

See also
James Stevenson (disambiguation)